Vallarsa (Cimbrian: Brandtal) is a comune (municipality) in Trentino in the northern Italian region Trentino-Alto Adige/Südtirol, located about  south of Trento.

The municipality of Vallarsa contains many frazioni (subdivision), the townhall is the frazione of Raossi.

Vallarsa borders the following municipalities: Rovereto, Trambileno, Ala, Valli del Pasubio and Recoaro Terme.

Demographic evolution

References

External links
 Homepage of the city

Cities and towns in Trentino-Alto Adige/Südtirol